Mohammad Reza Naqdi (also spelled "Naghdi") is a senior officer in the Revolutionary Guards.

Background
According to the biography published by the semi-official Fars News Agency, Naqdi was born in March 1961 in a middle-class religious family in Shapour neighbourhood of Tehran. Aging 16, he enrolled in University of Guilan in 1977 and co-founded its Anjoman-e Eslami. He helped founding Jihad of Construction in June 1979, before joining the Revolutionary Guards Intelligence Unit.

The Majalla claims that Naqdi is an Iraqi national with Iranian and Persian origins, son of Ali Akbar Thamahniy Shams, who was expelled in 1980 among convoys of Moaveds and was placed in the city of Naqadeh with his family. He was allegedly affiliated with the Islamic Supreme Council of Iraq.

Career

Earlier in his career Naqdi served as the Iranian Police Force's Counter-Intelligence Chief and is also reported to have been involved in "crackdowns" during the 1997-2005 administration of Khatami including the 1999 student protests. Amnesty International reported that in March 1999 Iranian authorities announced that General Naqdi, chief of police intelligence at the time, to be tried in May by a military court along with 10 of his subordinates. "The charges against them are believed to include 'unlawful arrest' and 'using torture to elicit confessions'." He was found not guilty.

Naqdi was appointed by Supreme Leader Ali Khamenei as commander of the Basij in October 2009, replacing Hossein Taeb. He has been described as possessing "conservative credentials" and his appointment was said (by Mohsen Sazegara) to have "shattered the hopes and plans of those who thought they could ease" the unrest and protest following the reelection of President Ahmadinejad.

2009 protests
On 14 February 2011 Naqdi was quoted by the semi-official Fars news agency as saying he believed the February protests in Iran had been started by "western spies" and that "western intelligence agencies are searching for a mentally challenged person who can set himself on fire in Tehran to trigger developments like those in Egypt and Tunisia." Naqdi was also quoted as saying the basij were "ready to sacrifice their lives" to defend the Islamic regime, and likened the opposition to the "party of Satan."

Two weeks later on 23 February 2011, the US Treasury Department imposed sanctions on General Naqdi, "for being responsible for or complicit in serious human rights abuses in Iran", adding him to the Office of Foreign Assets Control blacklist. The action subjects him "to visa sanctions" and "seeks to block any assets" he may have under U.S. jurisdiction, and "bans U.S. citizens from financial transactions with them".

Views
In an interview which aired on Al Manar TV on 28 May 2012 (as translated by MEMRI), Naqdi dismissed the possibility of an Israeli attack on Iran, stated that "Israel is much too small to carry out [an attack]. The [Israeli] statements serve only to amuse the terrified tyrants, who say: "We are here". If Israel commits even the slightest mistake or the slightest act of stupidity, it will be the last stupid mistake in its life. Any stupid military act that Israel carries out will be the last stupid act in the history of Israel. Israel is not capable of harming Iran. We consider this laughable."

In an interview which aired on Al Manar TV on 16 September 2012 (as translated by MEMRI), Naqdi stated that if Israel attacks Iran "all options will be open to the Iranian people. The liberation of Jerusalem has been on the minds of the Iranians for many years, and they are just waiting for the right moment. I say to the Zionists that any attack on Iran will not culminate in anything less than the liberation of Jerusalem."
Also Naqdi during his speech for officials of Basij in Iranian provinces threatened Israel and declared that Israeli attack on Hizbullah forces which led to killing of an Iranian revolutionary guard official in Alqonaitarah in Syria will be responded by liberating of Palestine.

After the Supreme leader of Iran ayatollah Ali Khamenei banned the import of British and US vaccines against COVID-19 in January 2021, General Naqdi commented that the ayatollah "does not recommend the injection of any foreign vaccine", because the genetic material (mRNA) it contains instructs cells to produce proteins.

References

External links

1952 births
Living people
People from Tehran
People from Najaf
Islamic Revolutionary Guard Corps brigadier generals
1961 births
Islamic Revolutionary Guard Corps personnel of the Iran–Iraq War
Quds Force personnel
Iraqi emigrants to Iran
Iranian individuals subject to the U.S. Department of the Treasury sanctions